

2008 NZIHL Standings

Grand Final
Botany Swarm 3 - 2 Canterbury Red Devils (sudden death extra time)

Round robin

W = Main Round Win = 3 points
L = Main Round Loss
T = Main Round Tie = 2 points
BP = Bonus Point = 1 point

2008 Season Results

2008 Leading Scorers

2008 NZIHL Awards
MVP of Botany Swarm - Zak Nothling

MVP of Canterbury Red Devils - Janos Kaszala

MVP of Dunedin Thunder - Paavo Huhtinen

MVP of Southern Stampede - Brett Speirs

MVP of West Auckland Admirals - Alex Gävfert

Best Defenceman - Hayden Argyle (Southern Stampede)

Top Goaltender - Zak Nothling (Botany Swarm)

Top Points Scorer - Janos Kaszala (Canterbury Red Devils)

League MVP - Valery Konev (Canterbury Red Devils)

Top Rookie - Daniel Nichols (Canterbury Red Devils)

Finals MVP -  Zak Nothling (Botany Swarm)

External links

New Zealand Ice Hockey League seasons
Nzihl Season, 2008
Ice
New